The 2002 BMC election was held in February 2002.

Election result 

Shiv Sena - BJP alliance won the 2002 BMC election with a clear majority. Indian National Congress and Nationalist Congress Party are other two major political parties in this election

References 

Brihanmumbai Municipal Corporation
Mumbai
2002 elections in India